Eyre is a ghost town in Chesterfield Rural Municipality, Saskatchewan, Canada. Originally established by the Jewish Colonization Association.  The Jewish block settlement was established in 1910 mostly of immigrants from Russia and some from the United States.

See also 

 List of communities in Saskatchewan
 Hamlets of Saskatchewan
 List of ghost towns in Canada
 Ghost towns in Saskatchewan

References

Chesterfield No. 261, Saskatchewan
Unincorporated communities in Saskatchewan
Populated places established in 1910
Ghost towns in Saskatchewan